Deeringia amaranthoides is a species of plant in the Amaranthaceae family and is distributed from the western Himalayas east across southern China, down through south east Asia and Indonesia, across New Guinea to parts of Australia.

It was first described as Achyranthes amaranthoides by Jean-Baptiste Lamarck in 1785 and reclassified as Deeringia amaranthoides by Elmer Drew Merrill in 1917.

Description

References

Amaranthaceae
Flora of Western Australia
Taxa named by Jean-Baptiste Lamarck
Flora of Queensland
Flora of New South Wales
Plants described in 1917
Flora of Asia